The Knockout Stage of the 1995 Fed Cup Europe/Africa Zone Group I was the final stage of the Zonal Competition involving teams from Europe and Africa. Those that qualified for this stage placed first and second in their respective pools.

The eight teams were then randomly drawn into two two-stage knockout tournaments, with the winners advancing to the World Group II Play-offs.

Draw

Semifinals

Slovenia vs. Czech Republic

Belarus vs. Russia

Hungary vs. Latvia

Belgium vs. Romania

Finals

Czech Republic vs. Belarus

  advanced to the World Group II Play-offs, where they were drawn against . They won, 4–1, and thus advanced to 1996 World Group II.

Hungary vs. Belgium

  advanced to the World Group II Play-offs, where they were drawn against . They won, 3–2, and thus advanced to 1996 World Group II.

See also
Fed Cup structure

References

External links
 Fed Cup website

1995 Fed Cup Europe/Africa Zone